For the Duration is a 1991 album by Rosemary Clooney, of songs popular during World War II. Clooney is accompanied by her usual small jazz group featuring Warren Vaché Jr., Scott Hamilton, and John Oddo, plus a string section.

Track listing
 "No Love, No Nothin'" (Leo Robin, Harry Warren) – 4:00
 "Don't Fence Me In" (Robert Fletcher, Cole Porter) – 4:25
 "I Don't Want to Walk Without You Baby" (Frank Loesser, Jule Styne) – 3:59
 "Ev'ry Time We Say Goodbye" (Porter) – 4:08
 "You'd Be So Nice to Come Home To" (Porter) – 3:23
 "Sentimental Journey" (Les Brown, Bud Green, Ben Homer) – 4:28
 "For All We Know" (J. Fred Coots, Sam M. Lewis) – 4:06
 "September Song" (Maxwell Anderson, Kurt Weill) – 4:19
 "These Foolish Things (Remind Me of You)" (Harry Link, Holt Marvell, Jack Strachey) – 5:58
 "They're Either Too Young or Too Old" (Loesser, Arthur Schwartz) – 2:14
 "The More I See You" (Mack Gordon, Warren) – 4:40
 "(There'll Be Bluebirds Over) The White Cliffs of Dover" (Walter Kent, Nat Burton) – 2:29
 "Saturday Night (Is the Loneliest Night of the Week)" (Sammy Cahn, Styne) – 3:48
 "I'll Be Seeing You" (Sammy Fain, Irving Kahal) – 4:18

Personnel
 Rosemary Clooney – vocals
 Warren Vaché Jr. – cornet
 Scott Hamilton – tenor saxophone
 John Oddo – piano
 Chuck Berghofer – bass
 Jim Hughart – bass
 Jake Hanna – drums

Source:

References

1991 albums
Concord Records albums
Rosemary Clooney albums